Tenore can refer to:
 Tenor, voice part, used especially in reference to Italian opera
 Baritone horn, brass instrument, Italian name used in scores
 Michele Tenore (1780-1861), Italian botanist
 Vincenzo Tenore (1825-1886), Italian botanist
 Tenore, stream of Lombardy, in Italy